Montalbán or Montalban may refer to:

Places 
 Montalbán, Teruel, a town in Teruel Province, Aragon, Spain
 Montalbán, Carabobo, a town in Venezuela
 Montalbán de Córdoba, a town in Córdoba Province, Andalucia, Spain
 La Puebla de Montalbán, a town in Toledo Province, Castile-La Mancha, Spain
 Villarejo de Montalbán, a town in Toledo Province, Castile-La Mancha, Spain
 Montalbán, Caracas, zone of Caracas, Venezuela
 Montalbán Municipality, Carabobo, Venezuela
 Rodriguez, Rizal, Philippines (formerly Montalban)
 Ricardo Montalbán Theatre, commonly known as The Montalbán, a theatre in Los Angeles

People 
 See Montalbán (surname)

See also 
 Montauban (disambiguation)